Levan is a Georgian name, equivalent to English Leo.

Other forms of name Levan used in Georgian are: Levaniko (ლევანიკო) and Levancho (ლევანჩო)

It may refer to:

Royalty and nobility
Levan of Kakheti, Georgian king
Levan of Imereti, Georgian king
Levan of Kartli, Georgian titular king and regent
Levan I Dadiani, Georgian ruler
Levan II Dadiani, Georgian ruler
Levan III Dadiani, Georgian ruler
Levan IV Dadiani, Georgian ruler
Levan V Dadiani, Georgian ruler
Levan Gruzinsky, Georgian royal prince
Prince Levan of Georgia, Georgian royal prince
Levan, Prince of Mukhrani, Georgian nobleman
Levan Abashidze, Georgian nobleman

People
Levan Saginashvili, Georgian armwrestler
Levan Songulashvili, Georgian artist
Levan Ghvaberidze, Georgian rugby union player
Levan Silagadze, Georgian footballer
Levan Akhvlediani, Georgian sports official
Levan Gorgadze, Georgian sumo wrestler
Levan Razmadze, Georgian judoka
Levan Sharashenidze, Georgian officer
Levan Razikashvili, Georgian policeman
Levan Abashidze, Georgian actor
Levan Agniashvili, Georgian lawyer
Levan Lagidze, Georgian painter
Levan Gvazava, Georgian footballer
Levan Sanadze, Georgian athlete
Levan Zhorzholiani, Georgian judoka
Levan Chilachava, Georgian rugby union player
Levan Tskitishvili, Georgian footballer
Levan Mchedlidze, Georgian footballer
Levan Berianidze, Georgian wrestler
Levan Korgalidze, Georgian footballer
Levan Datunashvili, Georgian rugby union player
Levan Khomeriki, Georgian footballer
Levan Gabriadze, Georgian actor and director
Levan Kenia, Georgian footballer
Levan Kobiashvili, Georgian footballer
Levan Gureshidze, Georgian luger
Levan Moseshvili, Georgian basketball player
Levan Melkadze, Georgian footballer
Levan Khmaladze, Georgian footballer
Levan Tediashvili, Georgian wrestler
Levan Gachechiladze, Georgian politician
Levan Kebadze, Georgian footballer
Levan Maghradze, Georgian footballer
Levan Nikoleishvili, Georgian colonel
Levan Aroshidze, Georgian chess grandmaster
Levan Chilashvili, Georgian archaeologist
Levan Dzharkava, Georgian footballer
Levan Kakubava, Georgian footballer
Levan Mikadze, Georgian footballer
Levan Gotua, Georgian writer
Levan Choladze, Georgian politician
Levan Varshalomidze, Georgian politician
Levan Latsuzbaya, Georgian footballer
Levan Aleksidze, Georgian jurist

Georgian masculine given names